Gleinys Reyes González (born 31 July 1989) is a Cuban handball player for Adesal Cordoba and the Cuban national team.

She competed at the 2015 World Women's Handball Championship in Denmark.

Individual Awards and Achievements
 2015 Nor.Ca. Women's Handball Championship: Top Scorer
 2015 Pan American Women's Handball Championship: Top Scorer
 2015 Pan American Women's Handball Championship: All Star Team Right Wing

References

External links

1989 births
Living people
People from Granma Province
Cuban female handball players
Cuban expatriate sportspeople in Spain
Pan American Games silver medalists for Cuba
Pan American Games medalists in handball
Handball players at the 2015 Pan American Games
Handball players at the 2019 Pan American Games
Medalists at the 2019 Pan American Games
21st-century Cuban women